Koltsovo may refer to:
Koltsovo, Novosibirsk Oblast, an urban-type settlement in Novosibirsk Oblast, Russia
Koltsovo, Yekaterinburg, a former urban-type settlement in Sverdlovsk Oblast, Russia; now a part of the city of Yekaterinburg
Koltsovo Airport, an airport in Yekaterinburg, Russia

See also
Koltsov